Nachan Main Audhay Naal (Punjabi: نچاں میں اودے نال) is the sixth pop music album of Pakistani singer Abrar-ul-Haq. It was released on June 1, 2004.

Track listing
"Bhaghaan Walio"   
"Bolian Pa Ke"   
"Dharti Hay Ma"   
"Hasian Di Jaach"   
"Mahi"   
"Naachan Main Oday Naal"   
"Pardesi"   
"Qurbani"   
"Sayyan Bina Ghar"   
"Shareekan Nu"

2004 albums
Abrar-ul-Haq albums